Bruce Kirwan Donaldson born 22 July 1938 in Armadale, Western Australia was an Australian politician. He was a member of the Western Australian Legislative Council representing the Agricultural region. Elected to Parliament in the 1993 state election he was a member of the Liberal Party and served until his retirement at the 2008 state election.

He completed his primary education at Gosnells Primary school, then his secondary education at Hale School and finally his tertiary education at Narrogin Agricultural College, where he graduated with honours.

References

Living people
Members of the Western Australian Legislative Council
Liberal Party of Australia members of the Parliament of Western Australia
People educated at Hale School
1938 births
Politicians from Perth, Western Australia
21st-century Australian politicians